ADP-ribosylation factor-like protein 8A is a protein that in humans is encoded by the ARL8A gene.

References

External links

Further reading